Alan Schilke is an engineer and roller coaster designer based in Hayden, Idaho, United States. He first made his mark on the industry by designing the 4th Dimension roller coaster, X2, while working with Arrow Dynamics. Schilke now works as a design engineer at Ride Centerline LLC and occasionally works with Rocky Mountain Construction (RMC).

Career

Schilke worked with Arrow Dynamics for many years working his way up to the role of head engineer. During his time at Arrow Dynamics, Schilke was credited as the designer of Road Runner Express at Six Flags Fiesta Texas and Tennessee Tornado at Dollywood. Around the same time, Schilke came up with the concept of the 4th Dimension roller coaster. This concept was criticised by his colleagues at Arrow Dynamics for being too extreme and impossible to engineer. The project only got off the ground when Six Flags' President Gary Story asked the company to develop a scaled-down prototype. This then led to the design of X which was installed at Six Flags Magic Mountain in 2001.

In December 2001, Arrow Dynamics filed for Chapter 11 bankruptcy, with the company being purchased by S&S Worldwide the following year. As part of the acquisition, Schilke (among many others) designed coasters for S&S Worldwide, heading up the wooden roller coaster division that produced four roller coasters in 2003 and 2004.

In 2006, Schilke along with Ned Hansen founded Ride Centerline LLC, an independent engineering firm in Hyde Park, Utah. Schilke continued to work with S&S and is responsible for the outward banking turn found on the S&S El Loco coasters such as Steel Hawg at Indiana Beach. In 2009 Schilke began providing design and engineering work for Rocky Mountain Construction, a company that specializes in the construction of roller coasters, water parks, steel buildings, miniature golf courses and go kart tracks. Schilke along with Rocky Mountain Construction founder Fred Grubb went on to design Iron Horse track (now known as I-Box track), an all-steel track replacement system for wooden roller coasters. The first installation of this track technology debuted on the New Texas Giant at Six Flags Over Texas in 2011.

In addition to providing designs for the amusement industry, Schilke and Hansen have worked with the Oceana Energy Company on the design and patent of water turbines to harness power from rivers and ocean tides.

Projects

As an employee of Arrow Dynamics
Road Runner Express at Six Flags Fiesta Texas
Tennessee Tornado at Dollywood
X² at Six Flags Magic Mountain
As an employee/consultant of S&S Arrow/S&S Worldwide
 Timberhawk: Ride of Prey at Wild Waves Theme Park
 Falken at Fårup Sommerland
 Avalanche at Timber Falls Adventure Park
Hell Cat at Clementon Amusement Park
Eejanaika at Fuji-Q Highland
Steel Hawg at Indiana Beach
As a consultant to Rocky Mountain Construction
New Texas Giant at Six Flags Over Texas
Outlaw Run at Silver Dollar City
Iron Rattler at Six Flags Fiesta Texas
Goliath at Six Flags Great America
Medusa Steel Coaster at Six Flags Mexico
Twisted Colossus at Six Flags Magic Mountain
Wicked Cyclone at Six Flags New England
 The Joker at Six Flags Discovery Kingdom
Storm Chaser at Kentucky Kingdom
Lightning Rod at Dollywood
Wildfire at Kolmarden Wildlife Park
Steel Vengeance at Cedar Point
Twisted Timbers at Kings Dominion
Wonder Woman Golden Lasso Coaster at Six Flags Fiesta Texas
RailBlazer at California's Great America
Twisted Cyclone at Six Flags Over Georgia
Untamed at Walibi Holland
Hakugei at Nagashima Spa Land
Zadra at Energylandia
 Iron Gwazi at Busch Gardens Tampa Bay 
 Jersey Devil Coaster at Six Flags Great Adventure
 Stunt Pilot at Silverwood Theme Park

References

External links
 Alan Schilke on the Roller Coaster DataBase

Patents
 Amusement rides and methods (US6523479)
 Rolling Vehicle Track (US20110146528)
 Improved rolling vehicle track (EP2475441 A1)
 System for generating electricity from fluid currents (EP2024636 A2)
 System for generating electricity from fluid currents (US7453166)
 System for generating electricity from fluid currents (US7604454)

21st-century American engineers
Roller coaster designers
Rocky Mountain Construction
Living people
People from Hayden, Idaho
1961 births
21st-century American inventors